The 1914 Presbyterian Blue Hose football team represented Presbyterian College as an independent during the 1914 college football season. Led by Erling Theller in his first and only season as head coach, the Blue Hose compiled a record of 4–1–1. The team captain was Alfred Miller.

Schedule

References

Presbyterian
Presbyterian Blue Hose football seasons
Presbyterian Blue Hose football